Sergey Akimov (born October 15, 1976) is a Russian professional ice hockey player. Akimov made his Kontinental Hockey League debut playing with HC Spartak Moscow during the 2008–09 season.

References

External links

1976 births
Living people
Amur Khabarovsk players
HC Spartak Moscow players
Russian ice hockey forwards
Ice hockey people from Moscow